This is a list of museums in Guam.

Museums in Guam 

National Museum of the Dulce Nombre de Maria
Pacific War Museum
War in the Pacific National Historical Park

See also 
 List of museums

External links 	

 
Guam
Guam
+Guam

Museums
Museums